Tomás MacCormik (born June 7, 1978 in Buenos Aires) is a field hockey midfielder from Argentina. MacCormik began playing hockey at age seven. He made his debut for the national squad in 1996, and competed for his native country in the 2000 Summer Olympics and the 2004 Summer Olympics. After the Athens Games, Tomás MacCormik moved from San Fernando to a Dutch club playing at the highest level, called Tilburg, together with fellow-international Matias Vila.

References
sports-reference

External links

1978 births
Living people
Argentine male field hockey players
Male field hockey midfielders
Olympic field hockey players of Argentina
Argentine people of Irish descent
Field hockey players at the 2000 Summer Olympics
2002 Men's Hockey World Cup players
Field hockey players at the 2004 Summer Olympics
Field hockey players from Buenos Aires
Pan American Games gold medalists for Argentina
Pan American Games silver medalists for Argentina
Pan American Games medalists in field hockey
Field hockey players at the 1999 Pan American Games
Field hockey players at the 2003 Pan American Games
Medalists at the 1999 Pan American Games
Medalists at the 2003 Pan American Games
21st-century Argentine people